Wampum is a borough in Lawrence County, Pennsylvania. The population was 557 at the 2020 census.  It is part of the New Castle micropolitan area.

Geography
Wampum is located at  (40.888657, -80.339650).

Wampum is drained by two tributaries to the Beaver River, including Eckles Run on the north and Wampum Run on the south.

Demographics

As of the census of 2000, there were 678 people, 290 households, and 182 families residing in the borough. The population density was 736.1 people per square mile (284.5/km2). There were 310 housing units at an average density of 336.6 per square mile (130.1/km2). The racial makeup of the borough was 97.05% White, 1.77% African American, 0.15% Native American, 0.44% Asian, and 0.59% from two or more races.

There were 290 households, out of which 24.5% had children under the age of 18 living with them, 49.0% were married couples living together, 10.0% had a female householder with no husband present, and 36.9% were non-families. 34.1% of all households were made up of individuals, and 20.3% had someone living alone who was 65 years of age or older. The average household size was 2.34 and the average family size was 2.99.

In the borough the population was spread out, with 23.0% under the age of 18, 5.6% from 18 to 24, 26.1% from 25 to 44, 22.9% from 45 to 64, and 22.4% who were 65 years of age or older. The median age was 42 years. For every 100 females there were 89.9 males. For every 100 females age 18 and over, there were 87.8 males.

The median income for a household in the borough was $29,205, and the median income for a family was $36,094. Males had a median income of $31,023 versus $26,071 for females. The per capita income for the borough was $15,598. About 11.8% of families and 17.9% of the population were below the poverty line, including 22.9% of those under age 18 and 13.9% of those age 65 or over.

Education

Wampum had its own school district called Wampum Public Schools from 1914 to 1962. The district also included students from nearby Chewton and, after 1954, New Beaver. Since 1962, children in Wampum proper and Chewton have attend Ellwood City Area School District, which is considered the legal successor to Wampum Public Schools due to state-mandated school consolidation in the 1960s. Due to a dispute with the former Big Beaver Township School District that had an informal union with Wampum Public Schools but never fully merged with Wampum, children in New Beaver have attended Big Beaver's successor Mohawk Area School District since Ellwood City absorbed Wampum Public Schools.

Notable people
Dick Allen, Major League Baseball player
Hank Allen, Major League Baseball player 
Ron Allen, Major League Baseball player 
Don Hennon, basketball player and surgeon
Stephen Johns, National Hockey League player for the Dallas Stars
William V. McBride, Former United States Air Force general

References

External links

Populated places established in 1796
Boroughs in Lawrence County, Pennsylvania
1796 establishments in Pennsylvania